Paul Conway (born 7 September 1953 in Chicago) is associate professor in the University of Michigan School of Information and has worked with Yale University and Duke University Universities after starting his career at the Gerald R. Ford Presidential Library. His research and educational work focuses primarily on digital preservation and electronic media. He has published extensively throughout his career on library preservation, conservation issues, and education of library and archives personnel.

Education 
In 1975, Conway received his BA (Honors) in History from Indiana University. He has an MA in history: administration of archives (1980) and  a Ph.D. in information and library studies (1991), both from the University of Michigan. His doctoral dissertation is titled "Archival Preservation in the United States and the Role of Information Sources". His research interests mainly focus on the challenges of digital information preservation and management.

Career and significance to preservation 
Conway began his career in October, 1977, when he joined the staff of the Gerald R. Ford Presidential Library as an archivist and worked there for 10 years. Between 1987 and 1989, Conway worked for the Society of American Archivists as a Preservation Program Officer. From January 1990 to May 1992, he worked for the National Archives and Records Administration in various research positions. It was here that he conducted research on the Use of Archives and a review of how government agencies implement digital imaging and optical disk technology. Conway also served successfully as Preservation Program Officer for the Society of American Archivists in Chicago in 1988 and 1989. During this period, he carried out a nationwide survey of archival preservation programs. For more than 20 years, Conway has been involved with the Society in which he is now a Fellow.

From 1992 to 2001, Conway headed the Preservation Department at Yale University Library. While at Yale, Conway held several administrative positions and managed digital research and development projects, including Project Open Book, a planning project exploring the complexities of guaranteeing long-term access to e-journal content produced by commercial publishers, and an exploration of the potential value of e-book content to library course reserve programs. While at Yale, Paul developed a framework for understanding preservation in the digital context by creating a bridge from the five core principles of traditional preservation practice.

Prior to going to University of Michigan, Conway led the library information technology programs and services at Duke University from August 2001 to August 2006, as director for information technology services and for digital asset initiatives. At Duke, Conway focused on developing a digital service for provision and preservation of digital resources to serve the university community. Since September 2006, he has been associate professor at the University of Michigan, School of Information.

His impact on the archival profession is also realized in his career as a successful educator. His extensive experience in administration of archives and the practice of preservation give him a practical approach to teaching as evidenced in his courses. Among the courses he has developed and taught over the past decade cover preservation management, archival approaches to digital content management, and digital preservation. He has also conducted several specialized workshops and seminars on information technology issues. From August 2001 to 2006, he was an Adjunct Associate Research and Teaching Professor at the University of North Carolina, Chapel Hill. He also was an Adjunct Associate Professor of Public Policy Studies and  Faculty Director for Curriculum Development at Duke from July 2005 – August 2006, where he developed a curriculum for first years, "Game2know,". From 1996 to 2006, Conway worked with the Society of American Archivists as an Instructor. He was involved in Designing and teaching full-day workshops on digital imaging technology, including definitions of terms, system requirements, preservation and access issues, project planning, and funding.

Conway has published widely on digital preservation issues, archival users and use of archival information. His contribution to the preservation literature is in form of books, articles in peer-reviewed journals, book chapters, book reviews and conference papers. He was a member of the American Archivist editorial board, 2006-2012.

Fellowships and awards 
1985 Mellon Fellowship, Bentley Historical Library, University of Michigan
1986 H. W. Wilson Scholarship, University of Michigan
1996 Fellow, Calhoun College, Yale University
1997 Fellow, Society of American Archivists
2004 Research Libraries Leadership Fellowship, Association of Research Libraries
2005 Paul Banks and Carolyn Harris Preservation Award

See also 
List of archivists
Digital preservation
Preservation (library and archival science)
Library and Information Science

References

External links 
The American Institute for Conservation
University of Michigan School of Information

1953 births
Living people
American archivists
Preservation (library and archival science)
University of Michigan faculty
University of Michigan School of Information alumni
Indiana University alumni
Yale University faculty